Wateringbury railway station is on the Medway Valley Line in Kent, England, serving the villages of Wateringbury and Nettlestead. The station and all trains that call are operated by Southeastern.

The station building, regarded as one of the finest Tudor-style stations in the country, was listed at Grade II in 1985.

The APTIS-equipped ticket office in this building (on the northbound platform) closed in 1989; the building has remained disused for many years, though is in reasonable condition. In 2007, a PERTIS permit to travel ticket machine was installed at the entrance to the northbound platform.

The signal box, which was Grade II listed in 2013 remains to control the level crossing.

Services
All services at Wateringbury are operated by Southeastern using  EMUs.

The typical off-peak service in trains per hour is:
 2 tph to  via 
 2 tph to  

On Sundays, the service is reduced to hourly in each direction.

References

External links

 Photograph of Wateringbury station in 1886

Tonbridge and Malling
Railway stations in Kent
DfT Category F2 stations
Former South Eastern Railway (UK) stations
Railway stations in Great Britain opened in 1844
Railway stations served by Southeastern
Grade II listed railway stations
Grade II listed buildings in Kent